Beinette is a comune (municipality) in the Province of Cuneo in the Italian region Piedmont, located about  south of Turin and about  east of Cuneo.

Beinette borders the following municipalities: Chiusa di Pesio, Cuneo, Margarita, Morozzo, and Peveragno.

Demographic evolution

References 

Cities and towns in Piedmont